Toraya can refer to:
Toraya Confectionery, Japan
Toraya District, Peru